Beppe is the diminutive of the Italian name Giuseppe and may refer to:

People
Giuseppe Bergomi (born 1963), retired Italian footballer
Beppe Carletti (born 1946), Italian musician, founder and keyboardist of the band I Nomadi
Beppe Ciardi (1875–1932), Italian painter
Beppe Costa (born 1941), Italian poet and novelist
Beppe Croce (1914–1986), Italian sailor
Beppe Fenoglio (1922–1963), Italian writer
Beppe Gabbiani (born 1957), Italian racing driver
Beppe Gambetta (born 1955), Italian musician
Beppe Grillo (born 1948), Italian activist, blogger, comedian, actor and politician
Beppe Severgnini, OBE, (born 1956), Italian journalist, writer and columnist
Giuseppe Signori (born 1968), retired Italian footballer
Beppe Wolgers (1928–1986), Swedish author, poet, translator, lyricist, actor, entertainer and artist

Fictional characters
Beppe, from Animal Crossing: Pocket Camp
Beppe di Marco, fictional character from the BBC soap opera EastEnders, played by Michael Greco

Italian masculine given names
Hypocorisms